White Oak Plantation, also known as the William Johnson House, is a historic plantation house located near Charlotte, Mecklenburg County, North Carolina.  It was built about 1792, and is a two-story, Catawba River Valley School style brick dwelling. The original Quaker plan interior has been converted to a center hall plan.  It has a gable roof overhang and a full-width, two-story gabled porch.  It was built by William Johnston, a captain in the North Carolina militia at the Battle of King's Mountain in 1780.

The plantation was listed on the National Register of Historic Places in 1978.

References

Plantation houses in North Carolina
Houses on the National Register of Historic Places in North Carolina
Houses completed in 1792
Houses in Charlotte, North Carolina
National Register of Historic Places in Mecklenburg County, North Carolina